Haywards Heath tunnel, also known as Folly Hill tunnel, is a railway tunnel on the Brighton Main Line between Haywards Heath and Wivelsfield. It is 249 yards (227 metres) long and is one of the shortest tunnels on the line.

There was an accident during the construction of this tunnel on 2 January 1841, causing a roof fall and killing three men, which prevented the railway from opening through to Brighton in the July. 

Until the 1970s this tunnel suffered from an excess of water falling from the ground above and in the 1840s it had to be lined with galvanised iron sheeting to prevent the water from falling on the third class passengers in open carriages.

Between October 2018 and February 2019, Haywards Heath tunnel was subject to a series of scheduled repairs as part of a £300m improvement programme on the Brighton Main Line; work was undertaken to reduce the ingress of water and re-lay the tracks during temporary closures.

References

External links
 Picture of the Haywards Heath tunnel under construction via haywardsheathlive.org.uk
 Image from the inside of Haywards Heath tunnel via networkrailmediacentre.co.uk

Railway tunnels in England
Buildings and structures in West Sussex
Tunnels in West Sussex
Haywards Heath